The 2012 Salt Lake County mayoral election was held to elect the Mayor of Salt Lake County, Utah on November 6, 2012, alongside the presidential, House of Representatives, Senate, and gubernatorial elections. This marked the fourth election to the office since the post was created in 2000.

Incumbent two-term Democratic County Mayor Peter Corroon honored his two-term pledge and did not run for a third term.

During the election, despite the county voting for Republicans Mitt Romney in the presidential election, Gary Herbert in the gubernatorial and Orrin Hatch in the Senate election, Democratic State Senator Ben McAdams managed to keep the mayor's office Democratic, defeating Republican candidate, former county councilman Mark Crockett.

Candidates

Democratic Party
 Ross Romero, Utah Senate Minority Leader
 Ben McAdams, Utah Senate 2nd District Senator since 2009

In the first round of delegates, McAdams won 57.4% of the vote against Romero's 42.6%. Under the party constitution, a candidate would have to get 60% of delegates' vote to win the party's nomination, otherwise they would have to face their challenger in a primary election. However, due to a newly-adopted rule, if a candidate received 57% of the vote, instead of a primary, the top two candidates would face off in a second round of balloting.

McAdams ran on working with Republicans, namely to allow Salt Lake City Mayor Ralph Becker pass an ordinance prohibiting workplace and housing discrimination against LGBT residents of the city. Romero preferred voters "being energized by Democrats and go to the polls to vote for Democrats".

McAdams defeated Romero in the second round, winning 62% of the vote against Romero's 38%.

Republican Party

Eliminated at convention
 Gary Ott, county recorder
 Richard Snelgrove, county councilman at-large, chairman of Salt Lake County GOP and Utah GOP
 Merrill Cook, Utah's 2nd congressional district representative 1997-2001, 2004 candidate
 Larry Decker, county auditor's office internal auditor

Advanced to runoff
 Mike Winder, Mayor of West Valley City, Utah
 Mark Crockett, former Salt Lake County councilman (2005-2008)

Republican runoff election

The runoff election was held on June 26, 2012.

General election
Debates were held on September 14, 2012 and September 26, 2012.

Polling

Results

References

2012 Utah elections
2012 United States mayoral elections
2012 in Utah
2010s in Salt Lake City